Baju Ban Reang (13 March 1941 – 21 February 2020), was an Indian politician from Tripura state. He was a member of the central committee and the secretariat of the Tripura state unit of the Communist Party of India (Marxist) (CPI(M)). He was also president of the Tripura Rajya Upajati Ganamukti Parishad.

Political career
Bajuban Reang was a member of the Tripura Legislative Assembly from 1967 to 1980. From 1978 to 1979, he was the Minister for Agriculture, Animal Husbandry, Cooperation and Fishery in the Tripura state government. In 1980, he was elected to the 7th Lok Sabha from Tripura East constituency in Tripura state. He was re-elected to the Lok Sabha in 1984, 1996, 1998, 1999, 2004 and 2009 from the same constituency.

Notes

External links
 Official biographical sketch in Parliament of India website

1941 births
2020 deaths
Communist Party of India (Marxist) politicians from Tripura
People from South Tripura
India MPs 1980–1984
India MPs 1984–1989
India MPs 1996–1997
India MPs 1998–1999
India MPs 1999–2004
India MPs 2004–2009
India MPs 2009–2014
Lok Sabha members from Tripura
Tripura politicians
Tripura MLAs 1967–1972
Tripura MLAs 1972–1977
Tripura MLAs 1977–1983